Kenton-on-Sea, more commonly known as Kenton, is a small coastal town on the Sunshine Coast, in the Eastern Cape of South Africa. It is situated between the Bushmans and the Kariega Rivers, and lies approximately halfway between the industrial centres of East London and Port Elizabeth. Kenton is part of the Ndlambe Local Municipality in the Sarah Baartman District Municipality of the Eastern Cape.

The town has a population of just over 5000 people.  The centre of Kenton is predominantly English-speaking, while the township of Ekuphumleni, which has a population of about 3600 people, is almost exclusively Xhosa-speaking.

References

External links

Town website
A real estate agency's description of Kenton on Sea's early history and amenities

Populated places in the Ndlambe Local Municipality
Populated coastal places in South Africa